Two submarines of the French Navy have borne the name Bévéziers:

 , a  launched in 1935 and sunk in 1942
 , an  completed in 1977 and stricken in 1998

French Navy ship names